(Modern ; "the driving-off of the cows of Cooley"), commonly known as The Táin or less commonly as The Cattle Raid of Cooley, is an epic from Irish mythology. It is often called "The Irish Iliad", although like most other early Irish literature, the Táin is written in prosimetrum, i.e. prose with periodic additions of verse composed by the characters. The Táin tells of a war against Ulster by Queen Medb of Connacht and her husband King Ailill, who intend to steal the stud bull Donn Cuailnge. Due to a curse upon the king and warriors of Ulster, the invaders are opposed only by the young demigod, Cú Chulainn.

The Táin is traditionally set in the 1st century in a pagan heroic age, and is the central text of a group of tales known as the Ulster Cycle. It survives in three written versions or "recensions" in manuscripts of the 12th century and later, the first a compilation largely written in Old Irish, the second a more consistent work in Middle Irish, and the third an Early Modern Irish version.

The Táin has been influential on Irish literature and culture. It is often considered Ireland's national epic.

Synopsis

The Táin is preceded by a number of remscéla, or pre-tales, which provide background on the main characters and explain the presence of certain characters from Ulster in the Connacht camp, the curse that causes the temporary inability of the remaining Ulstermen to fight and the magic origins of the bulls Donn Cuailnge and Finnbhennach. The eight remscéla chosen by Thomas Kinsella for his 1969 translation are sometimes taken to be part of the Táin itself, but come from a variety of manuscripts of different dates. Several other tales exist which are described as remscéla to the Táin, some of which have only a tangential relation to it.

The first recension begins with Ailill and Medb assembling their army in Cruachan; the purpose of this military build-up is taken for granted. The second recension adds a prologue in which Ailill and Medb compare their respective wealths and find that the only thing that distinguishes them is Ailill's possession of the phenomenally fertile bull Finnbhennach, who had been born into Medb's herd but scorned being owned by a woman so decided to transfer himself to Ailill's. Medb determines to get the equally potent Donn Cuailnge from Cooley to equal her wealth with her husband. She successfully negotiates with the bull's owner, Dáire mac Fiachna, to rent the animal for a year. However, her messengers, while drunk, reveal that Medb intends to take the bull by force if she is not allowed to borrow him. The deal breaks down, and Medb raises an army, including Ulster exiles led by Fergus mac Róich and other allies, and sets out to capture Donn Cuailnge.

The men of Ulster are disabled by an apparent illness, the ces noínden (literally "debility of nine (days)", although it lasts several months). A separate tale explains this as the curse of the goddess Macha, who imposed it after being forced by the king of Ulster to race against a chariot while heavily pregnant. The only person fit to defend Ulster is seventeen-year-old Cú Chulainn, and he lets the army take Ulster by surprise because he is off on a tryst when he should be watching the border. Cú Chulainn, assisted by his charioteer Láeg, wages a guerrilla campaign against the advancing army, then halts it by invoking the right of single combat at fords, defeating champion after champion in a stand-off lasting months. However, he is unable to prevent Medb from capturing the bull.

Cú Chulainn is both helped and hindered by supernatural figures from the Tuatha Dé Danann. Before one combat the Morrígan, the goddess of war, visits him in the form of a beautiful young woman and offers him her love, but Cú Chulainn spurns her. She then reveals herself and threatens to interfere in his next fight. She does so, first in the form of an eel who trips him in the ford, then as a wolf who stampedes cattle across the ford, and finally as a heifer at the head of the stampede, but in each form, Cú Chulainn wounds her. After he defeats his opponent, the Morrígan appears to him in the form of an old woman milking a cow, with wounds corresponding to the ones Cú Chulainn gave her in her animal forms. She offers him three drinks of milk. With each drink he blesses her, and the blessings heal her wounds. Cú Chulainn tells the Morrígan that had he known her real identity, he would not have spurned her.

After a particularly arduous combat Cú Chulain is visited by another supernatural figure, Lug, who reveals himself to be Cú Chulainn's father. Lug puts Cú Chulainn to sleep for three days while he works his healing arts on him. While Cú Chulainn sleeps the youth corps of Ulster come to his aid but are all slaughtered. When Cú Chulainn awakes he undergoes a spectacular ríastrad or "distortion", in which his body twists in its skin and he becomes an unrecognisable monster who knows neither friend nor foe. Cú Chulainn launches a savage assault on the Connacht camp and avenges the youth corps sixfold.

After this extraordinary incident, the sequence of single combats resumes, although on several occasions Medb breaks the agreement by sending several men against Cú Chulainn at once. When Fergus, his foster-father, is sent to fight him, Cú Chulainn agrees to yield to him on the condition that Fergus yields the next time they meet. Finally, Medb incites Cú Chulainn's foster-brother Ferdiad to enter the fray, with poets ready to mock him as a coward, and offering him the hand of her daughter Finnabair, and her own "friendly thighs" as well. Cú Chulainn does not wish to kill his foster-brother and pleads with Ferdiad to withdraw from the fight. There follows a physically and emotionally gruelling three-day duel between the hero and his foster-brother. Cú Chulainn wins, killing Ferdiad with the legendary spear, the Gáe Bolga. Wounded too sorely to continue fighting, Cú Chulainn is carried away by the healers of his clan.

The debilitated Ulstermen start to rouse, one by one at first, then en masse. King Conchobar mac Nessa vows, that as the sky is above and the Earth is beneath, he will return every cow back to its stall and every abducted woman back to her home. The climactic battle begins.

At first, Cú Chulainn sits it out, recovering from his wounds. Fergus has Conchobar at his mercy, but is prevented from killing him by Cormac Cond Longas, Conchobar's son and Fergus' foster-son, and in his rage cuts the tops off three hills with his sword. Cú Chulainn shrugs off his wounds, enters the fray and confronts Fergus, whom he forces to make good on his promise and yield before him. Fergus withdraws, pulling all his forces off the battlefield. Connacht's other allies panic and Medb is forced to retreat. Cú Chulainn comes upon Medb having her period ( "Then it was that the issue of blood came upon Medb" ). She pleads for her life and he not only spares her, but guards her retreat.

Medb brings Donn Cuailnge back to Connacht, where the bull fights Finnbhennach, kills him, but is mortally wounded, and wanders around Ireland dropping pieces of Finnbhennach off his horns and thus creating placenames before finally returning home to die of exhaustion.

Text

Oral tradition
Like the Icelandic sagas, the Táin is believed to have its origin in oral storytelling and to have only been written down during the Middle Ages.

Although Romanas Bulatovas believes that the Táin was originally composed at Bangor Abbey between 630–670 AD, there is evidence that it had a far older oral history long before anything was written down. For example, the poem Conailla Medb michuru ("Medb enjoined illegal contracts") by Luccreth moccu Chiara, dated to c. 600, tells the story of Fergus mac Róich's exile with Ailill and Medb, which the poet describes as having come from sen-eolas ("old knowledge"). Two further 7th-century poems also allude to elements of the story: in Verba Scáthaige ("Words of Scáthach"), the warrior-woman Scáthach prophesies Cú Chulainn's combats at the ford; and Ro-mbáe laithi rordu rind ("We had a great day of plying spear-points"), attributed to Cú Chulainn himself, refers to an incident in the Boyhood Deeds section of the Táin.

The high regard in which the written account was held is suggested by a ninth-century triad, that associated the Táin with the following wonders: "that the cuilmen [apparently a name for Isidore of Seville's Etymologiae] came to Ireland in its stead; the dead relating it to the living, viz. Fergus mac Róich reciting it to Ninníne the poet at the time of Cormac mac Faeláin; one year's protection to him to whom it is related."

Various versions of the epic have been collected from the oral tradition over the centuries since the earliest accounts were written down. Most recently, a version of the Táin was taken down in Scottish Gaelic by folklore collector Calum Maclean from the dictation of Angus Beag MacLellan, a tenant farmer and seanchaidh from South Uist, in the Outer Hebrides. A transcription was published in 1959.

Manuscripts
Despite the date of the surviving manuscripts, a version of the Táin may have been put to writing already in the eighth century.

Táin Bó Cúailnge has survived in three recensions. The first consists of a partial text in Lebor na hUidre (the "Book of the Dun Cow"), a late 11th-/early 12th-century manuscript compiled in the monastery at Clonmacnoise, and another partial text of the same version in the 14th-century manuscript called the Yellow Book of Lecan. These two sources overlap, and a complete text can be reconstructed by combining them. This recension is a compilation of two or more earlier versions, indicated by the number of duplicated episodes and references to "other versions" in the text. Many of the episodes are superb, written in the characteristic terse prose of the best Old Irish literature, but others are cryptic summaries, and the whole is rather disjointed. Parts of this recension can be dated from linguistic evidence to the 8th century, and some of the verse passages may be even older.

The second recension is found in the 12th-century manuscript known as the Book of Leinster. This appears to have been a syncretic exercise by a scribe who brought together the Lebor na hUidre materials and unknown sources for the Yellow Book of Lecan materials to create a coherent version of the epic. While the result is a satisfactory narrative whole, the language has been modernised into a much more florid style, with all of the spareness of expression of the earlier recension lost in the process.

The Book of Leinster version ends with a colophon in Latin which says:

An incomplete third recension is known from twelfth-century fragments.

In translation and adaptation

19th century translations of the work include Bryan O'Looney's  translation made in the 1870s, as Tain Bo Cualnge, based on the Book of Leinster in Trinity College Library, Dublin. John O'Daly's also translated the work in 1857, but it is considered a poor translation. No published translation of the work was made until the early 20th century – the first English translation was provided L. Winifred Faraday in 1904, based on the Lebor na hUidre and the Yellow Book of Lecan; a German translation by Ernst Windisch was published at around the same time based on the Book of Leinster.

Translated sections of the text had been published in the late 19th century, including one from on the Book of Leinster by Standish Hayes O'Grady in  The Cuchullin Saga (ed. Eleanor Hull, 1898), as well as extracts, and introductory text. Lady Gregory's Cuchulain of Muirthemne (1903) also contains a paraphrased version of the tale. There were also several works based on the tale published in the very late 19th and early 20th century often with a focus on the hero Cú Chulainn, such as Cuchulain, the Hound of Ulster (E.Hull, 1911); Dun Dealgan, Cuchulain's Home Fort (H.G. Tempest, 1910); Cuchulain of Muirtheimhne (A.M. Skelly, 1908); The Coming of Cuculain (S. O'Grady, 1894); and several others; additionally a number of prose works from the same period took the tale as basis or inspiration, including works by W.B. Yeats, Aubrey Thomas de Vere, Alice Milligan, George Sigerson, Samuel Ferguson, Charles Leonard Moore, Fiona Macleod, as well as ballad versions from Scotland. Peadar Ua Laoghaire adapted the work as a closet drama, serialized in the Cork Weekly Examiner (1900–1).

In 1914 Joseph Dunn authored an English translation The Ancient Irish Epic Tale Táin Bó Cúalnge based primarily on the Book of Leinster. Cecile O'Rahilly  published academic editions/translations of both recensions, Táin Bó Cúalnge from the Book of Leinster (1967), and Táin Bó Cúailnge Recension 1 (1976), as well as an edition of the later Stowe Version, The Stowe version of Táin Bó Cuailnge (1961).

 two translations by Irish poets are available in mass-market editions: Thomas Kinsella's The Táin (1969) and Ciarán Carson's The Táin (2007). Both are based primarily on the first recension with passages added from the second, although they differ slightly in their selection and arrangement of material. Kinsella's translation is illustrated by Louis le Brocquy (see Louis le Brocquy Táin illustrations) and also contains translations of a selection of remscéla.

Victorian era adapters omitted some aspects of the tale, either for political reasons relating to Irish Nationalism, or to avoid offending the sensibilities of their readers with bodily functions or sex. , focusing on translations and adaptation of "The Táin",  analysed how 19th- and 20th-century writers used the original texts in creating Irish myths as part of the process of decolonization (from the United Kingdom), and so redacted elements that did not show Cuchulain in a suitably heroic light. Not only was sex, and bodily functions removed, but also humor. The version by  took on a more 'folkish' aspect, whereas in O'Grady's version (see ) the protagonists more resembled chivalrous medieval knights.

Several writers bowdlerized the source: for example the naked women sent to attempt to placate Cú Chulainn were omitted by most adapters of the Victorian period, or their nakedness reduced. Others interpreted the tale to their own ends - One of Peadar Ua Laoghaire's adaptations of the work, the play "Méibh", included a temperance message, blaming the conflict over the bull on the drunkenness of the Connacht messengers. In Ua Laoghaire's serialization Medb retains her role as a powerful woman, but her sexuality, exploitation of her daughter Fionnabhair, and references to menstruation are heavily euphemized. Slightly later works such as Stories from the Táin  and the derived Giolla na Tána   were more accurate.

Remscéla

The story of the Táin relies on a range of independently transmitted back-stories, known as remscéla ('fore-tales'). Some may in fact have been composed independently of the Táin and subsequently linked with it later in their transmission. As listed by Ruairí Ó hUiginn, they are:

 De Faillsigud Tána Bó Cuailnge (How the Táin Bó Cuailnge was found), recounting how the story of the Táin was lost and recovered.
 Táin Bó Regamna (The cattle raid of Regamain)
 Táin Bó Regamon (The cattle raid of Regamon)
 Táin Bó Fraích ('The cattle Raid of Froech'): Froech mac Idaith is a Connacht warrior, killed by Cú Chulainn in the Táin; this tale gives him some back-story.
 Táin Bó Dartada (The cattle raid of Dartaid)
 Táin Bó Flidhais ('The cattle raid of Flidais'), a relatively late story drawing on older material
 Echtrae Nerai ('The Adventure of Nera')
 Aislinge Oengusa ('The Dream of Oengus'). Oengus Mac ind Óc, son of the Dagda has no part in the Táin Bó Cúailnge as we have it, but this tale relates how the otherworld woman Caer Ibormeith came to him in a vision how Oengus found her through the aid of Medb and Ailill. According to the story, this is why he helped them in their cattle-raid.
 Compert Con Culainn ('The Conception of Cú Chulainn')
 De Chophur in Dá Mucado (Of the cophur of the two swineherds)
 Fochann Loingsi Fergusa meic Róig (The cause of Fergus mac Róich's exile), only the beginning of which survives, apparently explaining how Fergus came to be part of the army of Connacht
 Longas mac nUislenn ('The Exile of the Sons of Uisliu'), explaining how Fergus and various other Ulster exiles came to be in the army of Connacht
 Tochmarc Ferbe (The wooing of Ferb).
 Ces Ulad (The debility of the Ulstermen), not actually considered one of the remscéla, but providing an important account of why Macha curses the Ulaid: they made her race against the king's horses while she was pregnant. The tale's primary purpose, however, is to provide an etiology for the place-name Emain Machae.

Cultural influence
 See Irish mythology in popular culture

See also
 Táin Bó
 Táin Bó Flidhais

References

Bibliography

Texts and Translations

, with illustrations by John Patrick Campbell

Translation 

Translation :

Further reading

, a paraphrase of the tale and others based on an oral translation

, in Roman type with English introduction and glossary
, in Gaelic type, same text as 
 Gene C. Haley, Places in the Táin: The Topography of the 'Táin Bó Cúailnge' Mapped and Globally Positioned (2012-).

External links

Timeless Myths: Ulaid Cycle
Táin Bó Cúailnge (Ernst Windisch's Irish transcription & Joseph Dunn's translation)

 
Narratives of the Ulster Cycle
Medieval literature
Early Irish literature
Irish-language literature
Irish texts
Ireland in fiction